Arthur Timothy Read is a fictional anthropomorphic aardvark created by the best-known author Marc Brown. He is in the third grade and lives in the fictional city of Elwood City.

Physical appearance

Arthur is an anthropomorphic aardvark, who is 8 years old. In Brown's first Arthur book, Arthur's Nose (1976), Arthur is shown with a long nose and resembles an actual aardvark, though as the books progressed (as seen in the first season of PBS's Reading Rainbow in its 13th episode, titled "Arthur's Eyes") and eventually became an animated TV series. The character's most recognizable form is a light brown, slanted face with small ears and nostrils with signature round brown-rimmed eyeglasses. Normally, Arthur wears a yellow V-neck sweater over a white dress shirt, blue jeans along with red and white sneakers. He also occasionally wears a red rugby-style sweater. In the series finale ("All Grown Up"), Arthur's 28-year-old appearance features him with straight dark brown hair, slight facial hair, a green vest with a hood, and a red and yellow shirt with a Dark Bunny insignia.

Arthur's relationships

Family
The tensions between Arthur and his 4-year-old sister, Dora Winifred "D.W." Read, are a common theme in the Arthur series. Arthur is constantly pestered by D.W., who goes out of her way to get Arthur into trouble, which often causes Arthur to retaliate, by getting into quarrels with his friends.

Arthur's parents are his mother, Jane Read, who is a work-at-home accountant, and his father, David L. Read, who runs a catering business.

Arthur's toddler sister is Baby Kate.

Appearances from Arthur's extended family include his grandparents: Thora (David's mother) and Dave (Jane's father). His uncles: Fred (Jane's brother), Richard, Bud, and Sean. His aunts: Jessica, Loretta, and Lucy. His cousins: Cora, Monique, Ricky, George, and other unnamed relatives. However, the only two members of Arthur's extended family who have appeared more than once are his grandparents.

Grandma Thora lives in a house not too far from Arthur's in Elwood City and is known to be a bad cook, but a loving grandmother and a world-class marbles player. She loves to play bingo every Friday night, and in some episodes has to watch over Arthur and D.W. She is good friends with Mrs. McGrady, the school cafeteria monitor. Grandpa Dave lives in a convalescent home and has a roommate who was a ship captain.

Voice actors 
Those Canadian child stars whom have been as the voice actor of Arthur in the TV series:
 Michael Yarmush (Seasons 1–5; "All Grown Up") (1996–2000, 2022)
 Justin Bradley (Season 6) (2001)
 Mark Rendall (Season 6 (U.S. reruns only), Seasons 7–8) (2002–2003)
 Cameron Ansell (Seasons 9–11) (2004–2007)
 Dallas Jokic (Seasons 12–15) (2008–2012)
 Drew Adkins (Seasons 16–17) (2012–2014)
 William Healy (Seasons 18–19) (2014–2016)
 Jacob Ursomarzo (Seasons 20–21) (2016–2019) 
 Roman Lutterotti (Seasons 22–25) (2019–2022)

Arthur was originally voiced by Michael Yarmush for the first five seasons. Due to reaching puberty, Yarmush was replaced with Justin Bradley for the 6th season. After that, he was replaced with Mark Rendall who started voicing Arthur in Season 7. After Season 8 ended, Rendall re-dubbed all of Bradley's dialogue in Season 6. Starting with the 9th season until the 11th season, he was replaced with Cameron Ansell. Soon after, Ansell was replaced by Dallas Jokic starting with Season 12 and ending with Season 15. From Seasons 16–17, Drew Adkins replaced Jokic for the role of Arthur. After Adkins got too old to play the character, William Healy replaced him for the role for Season 18 and Season 19. Healy was later replaced by Jacob Ursomarzo in the 20th season.
After Ursomarzo ended his role of Arthur after the 21st season, Roman Lutterotti replaced him for the final four seasons. Michael Yarmush reprised his role in the series finale "All Grown Up", voicing the adult Arthur.

International voice actors
Since Arthur is shown in more than 80 countries, Arthur is dubbed by those young voice actors (in several languages) shown here:
 Alfredo Leal (Seasons 1–2), Hector Emmanuel Gómez (Seasons 3–5), Kalimba Marichal (singing voice) (Latin American Spanish)
 Diego Larrea (Brazilian Portuguese)
 Matko Knešaurek (Seasons 1–4) (Croatian)
 Olli Parviainen (Finnish)
 Lawrence Arcouette (Seasons 1–3), Kim Jalabert (Seasons 4–6) (First dub in Quebecois French), Vincent de Bouard (Seasons 7–15), and Émilie Guillaume (Seasons 16–present) (2nd dub in European French) (French)
 Argiris Pavlidis, Andria Rapti, Vasia Lakoumenta, Nektarios Theodorou (Greek)
 Baráth István (Hungarian)
 Debbi Besserglick and Shiri Gadni (Besserglick voiced Arthur from its first run until her death from cancer in 2005. After her death, she was replaced by Shiri Gadni as the voice of Arthur in the following seasons.) (Hebrew)
 Simone D'Andrea (Italian)
 Lee Mi-ja (Daekyo) and Jeong Ok-joo (EBS) (Korean)
 Iman Bitar (1st voice) and Eman Hayel (2nd voice) (Arabic)
 Fariba Shahin Moghadam (Persian)
 Håvard Bakke (Norwegian)
 Teresa Chaves (1st voice) and Carlso Martins (2nd voice) (European Portuguese)
 Petre Ghimbăşan (Romanian)
 Elisabet Bargalló (Castilian Spanish)
 Leo Hallerstam (Swedish)

Reception
Arthur Read was listed as number 26 in the TV Guide article, 50 Greatest Cartoon Characters of All Time.

References

External links
 Arthur | PBS Kids

Arthur (TV series)
Fictional aardvarks
Fictional anthropomorphic characters
Fictional characters who break the fourth wall
Child characters in television
Literary characters introduced in 1976